St. John Cemetery is an official Roman Catholic burial ground located in Middle Village in Queens, a borough of New York City. Although it is mainly located in Middle Village, the southern edge of the cemetery runs along Cooper Avenue in Glendale. It is one of nine official Roman Catholic burial grounds in the New York Metropolitan Area. St. John, along with St. Charles/Resurrection Cemeteries in East Farmingdale, Long Island, is among the largest cemeteries in New York State. Since its opening, St. John has been the resting place of various famous and infamous people in New York City society, such as Mario Cuomo (1932–2015), Governor of the state of New York from 1983 to 1995, John F. Hylan (1868–1936), mayor of the city of New York from 1918 to 1925, Geraldine Ferraro (1935–2011), the first female vice presidential candidate representing a major American political party, Lucky Luciano (1897–1962), considered the father of modern organized crime in the United States, and John J. Gotti (1940–2002), the head of the New York City based Gambino crime family from 1985 to 2002.

Also buried here are fitness guru Charles Atlas (1893–1972), slain NYPD police officer Rafael Ramos (1974–2014), and photographer Robert Mapplethorpe (1946–1989).

Notable burials

Military members
 Medal of Honor Recipients
 William Henry Morin (1868–1935), Spanish–American War
 Louis E. Willett (1945–1967), Vietnam War

Organized crime members
 Frank Abbandando (1910–1942), "The Dasher"
 Charles "Lucky" Luciano (1897–1962), father of modern organized crime
 John Gotti (1940–2002), "The Teflon Don"
 Carlo Gambino (1902–1976)
 Joseph "Joe" Colombo (1923–1978)
 Salvatore D'Aquila (1878–1928)
 Aniello Dellacroce (1914–1985)
 Roy Albert DeMeo (1941–1983)
 John Dioguardi (1914–1979)
 Bill Dwyer (1883–1946)
 Carmine Fatico (1910–1991)
 John "Sonny" Franzese (1917–2020)
 Carmine Galante (1910–1979)
 Vito Genovese (1897–1969)
 Vannie Higgins (1897–1932), Prohibition era mob boss and rum runner
 Wilfred "Willie Boy" Johnson, (1935–1988)
 Carmine Lombardozzi (1913–1992)
 Harry Maione (1908–1942)
 Salvatore Maranzano (1886–1931)
 Michele Miranda (1896–1973)
 James Napoli (1911–1992)
 Vincent Papa (1917–1977)
 Joseph Profaci (1898–1962)
 Philip Rastelli (1918–1991)
 Frank Tieri (1904–1981)

Politicians
 Joseph Patrick Addabbo (1925–1986), US Congress
 Victor L'Episcopo Anfuso (1905–1966), US Congress
 Angelo J. Arculeo (1924–2013), New York City Council Minority Leader
 Louis Gary Clemente (1908–1968), US Congress
 Mario Cuomo (1932–2015), Governor of New York and father of Andrew Cuomo, Margaret I. Cuomo, Chris Cuomo and father-in-law to Kenneth Cole
 Geraldine Ferraro (1935–2011), US Congress and 1984 Vice Presidential candidate
 Joseph L. Pfeifer (1892–1974), US Congress
 John F. Hylan (1868–1936), Mayor of New York City from 1918 to 1925
 Felix J. Sanner (1867–1946), New York State Senate, 9th District

Others
 Emile Ardolino (1943–1993), filmmaker
 Charles Atlas (1893–1972), body builder
 Carmine Infantino (1925–2013), comics artist and editor
 Robert Mapplethorpe (1946–1989), artist, photographer
 John P. McGarr (1964–2010), actor, movie producer
 Vincent F. Seyfried (1918–2012), historian of Long Island
 Edward Payson Weston (1839–1929), professional pedestrian and celebrity
 Victims of the 1984 Palm Sunday Massacre
 Juan Enrique Lopez (1979–1984)
 Noel Maldonado (1979–1984)
 Alberto Maldonado (1978–1984)
 Eddie Lopez Jr. (1977–1984)
 Maria Isabel Perez (1973–1984)
 Migdalia Perez (1969–1984)
 Carmen Perez (1961–1984)
 Virginia Lopez (1961–1984)
 Virginia Lopez's 8-month-old unborn child

References

External links
 

Roman Catholic cemeteries in New York (state)
Cemeteries in Queens, New York
Middle Village, Queens